A salvo is the simultaneous discharge of artillery or firearms.

Salvo may also refer to:

People and fictional characters
Salvo (surname), a list of people and fictional characters named Salvo, De Salvo, DeSalvo, Di Salvo or DiSalvo
Salvo (given name), a list of people and fictional characters
Salvo (artist), Italian artist Salvatore Mangione (1947-2015)

Places
Salvo, North Carolina, an unincorporated community
Palacio Salvo, a building in Montevideo, Uruguay
29672 Salvo, an asteroid

Arts and entertainment
Salvo (film), a 2013 Italian film
Salvo (band), an American punk pop and rock band
Salvo, the original name for the game Battleship

Other uses
Salvo (magazine), a Christian magazine published by the Fellowship of St. James
The Salvation Army in Australia, nicknamed "Salvos" in Australian English
Salvo (detergent), a brand of laundry detergent manufactured by Procter and Gamble in the 1960s and 1970s
Project SALVO, a US Army project for the development of an individual weapon
Springfield Armory SALVO, a rifle considered by Project SALVO

See also 

Porto Salvo, a civil parish (Freguesias) in Oeiras, Portugal
San Salvo, a comune and town in the Province of Chieti in the Abruzzo region of Italy

Salva (disambiguation)
Salve (disambiguation)